Feliksas Kriaučiūnas (Americanized his name as Phil Krause; August 18, 1911 – October 28, 1977) was a Lithuanian American basketball player and coach. He won two gold medals with Lithuania national basketball team and silver medal with Lithuania women's national basketball team.

Biography
Feliksas studied and played for University of Notre Dame team, along with his brother Moose Krause. Later he moved to DePaul University and played for their university team. In 1935, along with other Lithuanian Americans, he started teaching Lithuanians how to play basketball. He was Lithuania national basketball team player-coach and team captain during EuroBasket 1937 and EuroBasket 1939. As soon as World War II begun in 1939, Kriaučiūnas and his brother traveled back to the United States. Kriaučiūnas played a total of 19 games, scoring 65 points. He also was the head coach of Lithuania women's national basketball team during the first ever women's EuroBasket in 1938 where Lithuania won silver medals. He also firmly contributed in developing nowadays basketball in Lithuania.

State awards
 Order of Vytautas the Great Officer Cross (1937)

See also 
 List of FIBA EuroBasket winning head coaches

References
Footnotes

Bibliography
Vidas Mačiulis, Vytautas Gudelis. Halė, kurioje žaidė Lubinas ir Sabonis. 1939–1989 – Respublikinis sporto kombinatas, Kaunas, 1989

1911 births
1977 deaths
DePaul Blue Demons men's basketball players
Notre Dame Fighting Irish men's basketball players
FIBA EuroBasket-winning coaches
FIBA EuroBasket-winning players
Lithuanian basketball coaches
Lithuanian men's basketball players